is a railway station located in the city of Tainai, Niigata Prefecture, Japan.

Lines

Station layout
The station consists of two opposed side platforms connected by a footbridge. The station is unattended.

Platforms

History
The station opened on 1 November 1914. With the privatization of Japanese National Railways (JNR) on 1 April 1987, the station came under the control of JR East.

Surrounding area
The station is mainly used by students who live in the area. Points of interest include:
 Hirakida Ekimae Post Office
 Idaten Shrine
 Idaten-yama Ruins
 Oppō-ji

See also
 List of railway stations in Japan

External links

 JR East station information 

Railway stations in Japan opened in 1914
Railway stations in Niigata Prefecture
Uetsu Main Line
Tainai, Niigata